Watson's Corner is the historical name for an intersection in Cambridge, Massachusetts, at the corner of Rindge Avenue and Massachusetts Avenue.  It was part of a wider area called Watson's Plain in colonial and Revolutionary War times and well into the 19th century.

Watson's Corner gained notability on account of a skirmish that occurred there on April 19, 1775 in connection with the Battles of Lexington and Concord.  A marker at 2154 Massachusetts Avenue commemorates the skirmish.  An account of this event from the Cambridge city website describes the scene thus:
At Watson’s Corner (the present intersection of Rindge and Massachusetts avenues) Cambridge patriots lay in wait behind a pile of barrels, but were surprised by flanking redcoats. John Hicks and Moses Richardson of Cambridge and Isaac Gardner of Brookline were killed, as was William Marcy, a "simple-minded youth" who thought he was watching a parade.

References 

History of Cambridge, Massachusetts
Massachusetts in the American Revolution